Mecyna submedialis, the orange-toned mecyna moth, is a moth in the family Crambidae. It was described by Augustus Radcliffe Grote in 1876. It is found in North America, where it has been recorded from Ontario and Michigan, south to Florida and west to Arkansas. It has also been recorded from Alberta.

The wingspan is about 25 mm. Adults have been recorded on wing from July to August.

References

Moths described in 1876
Spilomelinae